Richard "Dick" Stanley Smith (June 20, 1931 – October 8, 1978) was the Liberal MPP for Nipissing in Ontario from 1966 to 1977.

He died of a heart condition at a hospital on October 8, 1978, aged 47.
His daughter, Monique Smith, represented the riding from 2003 to 2011.

References

External links
 

1931 births
1978 deaths
Ontario Liberal Party MPPs
People from North Bay, Ontario